Areius or Areius Didymus or Arius was an Alexandrian philosopher of the Pythagorean or Stoic schools who lived in the 1st century BCE. He was the "personal philosopher" of the Roman emperor Augustus for a time.

Augustus esteemed him so highly that after the conquest of Alexandria, he declared that he spared the city chiefly for the sake of Areius. Modern scholars disagree over whether this was the actual reason Augustus spared the city, as at the same time Augustus claimed he was also doing it to honor the memory of Alexander the Great, and some scholars also suggest that he did it to curry favor with that city's elite.

Areius as well as his two sons, Dionysius and Nicanor, are said to have instructed Augustus himself in philosophy, and Areius for a time resided directly within Augustus's household. He is frequently mentioned by the philosopher Themistius, who says that Augustus valued Areius not less than Marcus Vipsanius Agrippa, who is commonly thought of as Augustus's confidant and right-hand man (though it must be mentioned that Themistius was writing four hundred years after the fact).

Others sources state that he was offered the post of Praefectus or governor of Egypt, but that Areius turned Augustus down in order to take a post in the province of Sicilia, though modern scholars have some doubt about this anecdote (primarily because there are no other examples of anyone being "offered" a post by Augustus and having turned him down). It has been suggested that this story was state propaganda to justify Augustus's removal of Areius from the province of Egypt and installation of Cornelius Gallus as Praefectus.

Areius was succeeded as "personal philosopher" of Augustus by the philosopher Theon. From Quintilian  it appears that Areius also taught or wrote on rhetoric.

Notes

Stoic philosophers
Pythagoreans
Ancient Alexandrians
1st-century BC Egyptian people
1st-century BC philosophers